"December Brings Me Back to You" is the second single from Andy Abraham. It also featured Michael Underwood. It was released in the UK on 11 December 2006. It is a new original track from his second album, Soul Man. It charted at #18 in the UK Singles Chart.

Track listing
"December Brings Me Back to You"
"Don't Leave Me This Way"

Charts

2006 songs
Songs written by Mark Read (singer)
Songs written by Cliff Masterson